Stellaria nemorum, also known by the common name wood stitchwort, is a stoloniferous herbaceous perennial flowering plant in  the family Caryophyllaceae.

Description 
It reaches a height of 60 cm and blooms from May to August. The leaves are opposite, the upper leaves sessile and the lower leaves petiolate. The flowers are white, with 5 deeply bifid petals, 10 stamens and 3 styles.

Distribution 
It is native to Europe and thrives in wet places of deciduous forests, such as beech forests.

References

External links 

nemorum
Flora of Europe
Plants described in 1753
Taxa named by Carl Linnaeus